Samuel D. Warren (1817-1888) was an American paper magnate and the founder of the S. D. Warren Paper Mill in Westbrook, Maine. Noted for his benevolence and paternalism, Warren built a commercial block adjacent to the mill which is named in his honor.

Family
Warren had four children, all of whom were well-known in their fields. A son, Samuel D. Warren II, was an attorney who co-published an influential article entitled The Right to Privacy in 1890.  Daughter Cornelia Warren was an American farmer and an educational and social service philanthropist. Son Henry Clarke Warren was an American scholar of Sanskrit and Pali. Edward Perry Warren was an art collector and the author. Fiske Warren was also involved in the paper business.

References

1817 births
1888 deaths
Businesspeople from Boston
Businesspeople in the pulp and paper industry
Westbrook, Maine
Pulp and paper industry in Maine